Brüll or Bruell is a surname.

The British surname Bruell has been identified as a variation of Brewell,  derived from the village of Braithwell, West Yorkshire.

Other variants of this surname include Briel, Brill and Bril. .

Notable people with the name include:

Ignaz Brüll, composer
Jan Bruell, psychologist and geneticist
Nehemiah Brüll (1843–1891), rabbi and scholar
 (1812–1889), rabbi and Talmudic scholar

See also
Bruell F.C., early 20th-century American football club later known as Cleveland Bruell Insurance
 Brull (disambiguation)
 Bruel (disambiguation)
 Brühl (disambiguation)

References